The 1951–52 Serie A season was won by Juventus.

Teams
SPAL and Legnano had been promoted from Serie B.

Six out of the twenty clubs came from Lombardy, a record for a single region of Italy.

Events
FIGC decided to restore the original 18-clubs format, so a special relegation would have been necessary.

Final classification

Results

Relegation tie-breaker
The 3 last-placed teams in Serie A were guaranteed relegation. However, due to a tie for 17th place between Lucchese and Triestina, the teams had to play a tie-breaker to determine which team would be relegated and which team qualified for the playoff.

Game played in Bergamo

The match was null.

Game played in Milan

Lucchese was relegated and Triestina qualified for the playoff game against Brescia, Serie B's 2nd-placed team.

Serie A qualification play-off
Since it was decided to reduce the number of Serie A teams from 20 to 18 for the 1952-1953 season, only the top 16 teams in Serie A were guaranteed to remain there the following season, and only the first-placed team in Serie B was guaranteed a direct promotion to Serie A. The 18th team would be decided in a one-game playoff between the 17th-placed team in Serie A and the 2nd-placed team in Serie B.

Game played in Valdagno

Triestina maintained its place in Serie A.  Lucchese, Padova and Legnano were relegated while only Roma, the Serie B champion, was promoted.

Top goalscorers

References and sources
Almanacco Illustrato del Calcio - La Storia 1898-2004, Panini Edizioni, Modena, September 2005

External links
  - All results on RSSSF Website.

Serie A seasons
Italy
1951–52 in Italian football leagues